Jacob Melskens  (born 20 March 1985) is a Danish former tennis player, who represented Denmark in the Davis Cup.

Tennis career
Melskens played in four Davis Cup ties for Denmark, making his debut in 2005 during the Group III play-off against Bosnia and Herzegovina. During his Davis Cup career, he won his one singles match and 3 of the 4 doubles matches that he played.

Melskens mainly participated on the Futures circuit and partnering with Rasmus Nørby, won one Futures doubles title.

ITF Futures titles

Doubles: 1

See also
List of Denmark Davis Cup team representatives

References

External links

1985 births
Living people
Danish male tennis players
21st-century Danish people